Knox County is located in the U.S. state of Tennessee. As of the 2020 census, the population was 478,971, making it the third-most populous county in Tennessee. Its county seat is Knoxville, which is the third-most populous city in Tennessee. Knox County is included in the Knoxville metropolitan area. The county is located at the geographical center of the Great Valley of East Tennessee. Near the heart of the county is the origin of the Tennessee River, at the confluence of the Holston and French Broad rivers.

History
Knox County was created after the American Revolutionary War on June 11, 1792, by Governor William Blount from parts of Greene and Hawkins counties. It was one of the few counties created when this area was still known as the Southwest Territory. It is one of nine United States counties named for American Revolutionary War general Henry Knox, who was appointed as the first United States Secretary of War. As population increased, parts of Knox County were taken out to form Blount (1795), Anderson (1801), Roane (1801), and Union (1850) counties.

In 1783, James White and Francis Alexander Ramsey led an expedition to explore the Upper Tennessee Valley, now within the boundaries of Knox County. White moved to what is now the Riverdale community in the eastern part of the county in 1785, and the following year constructed a fort a few miles to the west. A community developed around the fortified trading post, ultimately becoming the city of Knoxville. Governor Blount designated the fort as the capital of the Southwest Territory in 1790, and gave the new town the name "Knoxville" after his superior, Henry Knox.

Blount began construction of his house, Blount Mansion, in the early 1790s. This is one of a number of late eighteenth-century structures that have been preserved in the county. The house still stands in downtown Knoxville. The Alexander McMillan House, built in the mid-1780s by Alexander McMillan (1749–1837), still stands in eastern Knox County. The Alexander Bishop House, built by Stockley Donelson in 1793, and a log house built in the same year by Nicholas Gibbs both still stand in the northern part of the county. Campbell's Station, a fort and stagecoach stop located in what is now Farragut, was built by Captain David Campbell (1753–1832) in 1787. John Sevier established a plantation, known as Marble Springs, in the southern part of the county in the 1790s. He was active in leading raids against the Cherokee people, who for years resisted with force American settlement in their territory.

Civil War

Important railroad lines passed through Knox County, making it a strategic area both for Union and for Confederate forces throughout the Civil War. Since the mountainous terrain of East Tennessee was mostly unsuitable for plantation crops such as cotton, slavery was not as prevalent as it was in Middle and West Tennessee. The US 1860 census of Knox County showed a population of 20,020 white citizens and 2,370 enslaved African Americans. The lack of slavery combined with the vestiges of a once-strong abolitionist movement were two reasons most residents of Knox County, along with much of East Tennessee, were pro-Union. In February 1861, 89% of Knox Countians voted for the pro-Union ballot in a statewide referendum on secession. On June 8, 1861, the county voted against Tennessee's Ordinance of Secession by a margin of 3,108 to 1,226.

Prior to secession, Unionists from Knox County collaborated with other East Tennessee Unionists in an attempt to secede from Tennessee itself and remain part of the Union. Oliver Perry Temple, a Knoxville lawyer, was named to a three-man commission to appear before the General Assembly in Nashville and request East Tennessee and pro-Union Middle Tennessee counties be allowed to secede from the state. The attempt failed. After the second state referendum for secession passed in 1861, Knox County and the rest of Tennessee joined the Confederacy.

Knox County remained under Confederate control until September 3, 1863, when General Ambrose Burnside and the Union army marched into Knoxville unopposed. Parts of Middle Tennessee had been occupied by Union troops since 1862.

Union Colonel William Harris, son of New York Senator Ira Harris, wrote his father:

With the success of Burnside's troops in the Knoxville Campaign, and especially during the decisive Battle of Fort Sanders, Knox County remained under Union control for the duration of the Civil War.

Tennessee marble

In the late 19th and early 20th centuries, Knox County was an important venue for the quarrying and finishing of Tennessee marble, a type of limestone used in monument construction across the United States and Canada. Eleven quarries were operating in Knox County in 1882, and within ten years that number had doubled. Notable quarries in Knox included the Bond Quarry in Concord, an Evans Company quarry near Forks-of-the-River, and the Ross-Republic quarries near Island Home Park in South Knoxville. Finishing centers were located in Lonsdale and at the Candoro Marble Works in South Knoxville.

Geography

The county lies amidst the Ridge-and-Valley Appalachians, which are characterized by long, narrow ridges, oriented northeast-to-southwest, alternating with similarly shaped valleys. Notable ridges in the county include Bays Mountain, McAnnally Ridge, Beaver Ridge, Sharp's Ridge and Copper Ridge.

The Holston and French Broad rivers join to form the Tennessee River in the eastern part of the county, an area known as "Forks-of-the-River." This section of the river is part of Fort Loudoun Lake, which is created by Fort Loudoun Dam on the river several miles downstream in Lenoir City.

Cherokee Caverns

Cherokee Caverns is 14 miles west of Knoxville and can be accessed by Highway 62. It was discovered in 1854 by Robert Crudgington, who noticed fog emerging between rocks on his farm. He dug the entrance open and explored the cave. His daughter Margaret Crudgington opened the cave to the public in 1929 under the name Gentrys Cave; the next year she changed the name to Grand Caverns.

The cave has been open to the public, sporadically, ever since, under a variety of names. It is currently called Cherokee Caverns, referring to the historic tribe who occupied this area at the time of European encounter.

Indian artifacts located in the cave indicate that another entrance to the cave existed at some time in the past.

Adjacent counties

Union County (north)
Grainger County (northeast)
Jefferson County (east)
Sevier County (southeast)
Blount County (south)
Loudon County (southwest)
Roane County (west)
Anderson County (northwest)

State protected areas
Forks of the River Wildlife Management Area
Fort Loudoun Wildlife Management Area
House Mountain State Natural Area
Marble Springs (state historic site)
Seven Islands State Birding Park

Demographics

2000 census
As of the census of 2000, there were 382,032 people, 157,872 households, and 100,722 families residing in the county. The population density was 751 people per square mile (290/km2). There were 171,439 housing units at an average density of 337 per square mile (130/km2). The racial makeup of the county was 88.10% White, 8.63% Black or African American, 0.26% Native American, 1.29% Asian, 0.03% Pacific Islander, 0.50% from other races, and 1.18% from two or more races. 1.26% of the population were Hispanic or Latino of any race.

There were 157,872 households, out of which 28.50% had children under the age of 18 living with them, 49.80% were married couples living together, 10.90% had a female householder with no husband present, and 36.20% were non-families. 29.60% of all households were made up of individuals, and 9.10% had someone living alone who was 65 years of age or older. The average household size was 2.34 and the average family size was 2.92.

In the county, the population was spread out, with 22.30% under the age of 18, 11.60% from 18 to 24, 30.40% from 25 to 44, 23.10% from 45 to 64, and 12.70% who were 65 years of age or older. The median age was 36 years. For every 100 females, there were 93.50 males. For every 100 females age 18 and over, there were 90.10 males.

The median income for a household in the county was $37,454, and the median income for a family was $49,182. Males had a median income of $35,755 versus $25,140 for females. The per capita income for the county was $21,875. About 8.40% of families and 12.60% of the population were below the poverty line, including 14.50% of those under age 18 and 9.70% of those age 65 or over.

2010 census
As of the census of 2010, there were 432,226 people, 177,249 households, and 110,757 families residing in the county. The population density was 821.72 persons per square mile. The average housing unit density was 348.92 units per square mile. The racial makeup of the county was 86.78% White, 8.8% Black or African American, 0.29% Native American, 1.87% Asian, 0.08% Pacific Islander, and 1.91% multiracial. Hispanics and/or Latinos (of any race) were 3.47% of the population.

Out of all the households, 29.68% had children under the age of 18 living in them, 47.04% were family households, 3.95% had a male householder with no wife present, 11.49% had a female householder with no husband present, and 37.51% were non families. 29.65% of all households were made up of individuals living alone, and 9.14% had someone living alone who was 65 years of age or older. The average household size was 2.37 and the average family size was 2.95.

21.86% of the population was under the age of 18, 65.07% from ages 18 to 64, and 13.05% aged 65 and older. The median age was 37.2 years. 51.39% of the population was female, and 48.61% was male.

The median household income was estimated to be $52,458, and the per capita income was estimated to be $30,541. Approximately 13.5% of the population was below the poverty line.

2020 census

As of the 2020 United States census, there were 478,971 people, 191,925 households, and 118,160 families residing in the county.

Government and politics
Like most counties in heavily Unionist East Tennessee, Knox County has historically been strongly Republican. Although it is somewhat conservative for an urban county, it is slightly less Republican than the rest of East Tennessee. This is largely due to the influence of Knoxville, which has elected Democratic mayors and regularly sends Democrats to the state legislature. However, the suburban and rural areas are among the most Republican areas of Tennessee and the South.

Presidentially, Franklin Roosevelt carried the county in three of his four presidential elections, while several nearby counties are among the only counties in the nation to have never supported a Democratic candidate for president in their entire existence. Nevertheless, Democratic candidates have crossed the 40-percent mark only seven times since Roosevelt's death. In 1964, it was nearly swept up in Lyndon Johnson's national landslide; Johnson lost the county by only 334 votes. Jimmy Carter in 1976 and Bill Clinton in 1992 and 1996 are the only Democrats since then to come reasonably close to carrying the county, losing it by single-digit margins; in Clinton's case with Tennessean Al Gore on the ticket. Gore lost the county by 17 points in 2000 during his own bid for president, but still managed 40 percent. The Democrats would not cross the 40 percent threshold again until 2020, when Joe Biden received over 41 percent of the county's vote.

The government of Knox County, Tennessee operates under a home rule format. The county administrator, formerly known as the County Executive, is called the County Mayor. There is also an elected county commission, which consists of 11 members. Knox County is divided into nine commission districts, with one commissioner elected from each district. Two commissioners are elected countywide and serve as at-large representatives. The county commissioners' districts do not correspond with those of the city of Knoxville, which has its own mayor and city council. Residents of the county living within Knoxville city limits vote both in city and in county elections, are represented by city and county mayors, and pay city and county taxes. While the administration appears to be duplicated, services tend to be separated. Knox County runs the local school and library systems. Knoxville maintains a police department independent of the county sheriff. The property assessor's office, tax offices, and the Metropolitan Planning Commission are combined between the city and county governments. All Knox County elections are conducted on a partisan basis.

Executive branch
The county mayor is the head of the executive branch of Knox County Government. The current county mayor is Glenn Jacobs, better known by his WWE identity of Kane. According to the county's charter, the mayor is the chief financial officer of the county, which includes developing the county's annual budget, approving county contracts, etc. Other responsibilities of the county mayor's office include maintaining county roads, highways and bridges, codes enforcement and operating the county's health department and library system.

The mayor has the authority to veto resolutions and ordinances passed by the Knox County Commission. A majority-plus-one vote is required to override a mayoral veto, unless the vetoed legislation was required to have a two-thirds vote for original passage. In such cases, a two-thirds vote of the commission is required to override the veto.

Executive branch departments
Finance
Purchasing
Community Development
Engineering & Public Works
Highway Engineering
Highway Maintenance
Stormwater Management
Codes Enforcement
Solid Waste & Recycling
Fire Prevention Bureau
Probation
Risk Management & Human Resources
Veterans Services
Senior Services
Health Department
Air Quality
Knox County Public Library
Constituent Services
Communications
Information Technology

Legislative branch
The Knox County Board of Commissioners is the legislative body of Knox County and consists of 11 members: nine elected at the district level and two elected countywide to serve at-large. Commissioners meet multiple times each month, with their primary business meetings being a monthly work session and a monthly voting meeting. During the work session, commissioners generally debate items on the monthly agenda and take a non-binding vote on each item in advance of the more formal voting meeting, which is generally held the following week.

The Board of Commissioners approves resolutions, ordinances, honorariums, road names, as well as most county contracts and large expenditures. Resolutions require a single vote for passage, while ordinances require two votes, or "two readings". The County Commission also serves as the appropriating body of the county and must approve an annual budgetpresented by the mayorwhich includes funding for the various county departments, including the Knox County Schools. The body also sets the property tax rate for the county.

Sheriff
The Knox County Sheriff serves as the top law enforcement office of the county, and is elected countywide. The sheriff is responsible for overseeing the county jail, providing courtroom officers, serving warrants and providing general law enforcement functions, such as patrol and criminal investigation.

Controversies

On February 11, 2017, Brandon Lambert was wanted on multiple warrants for property crimes. Sheriffs Deputies shot him to death in a Turkey Creek parking lot after, allegedly, his vehicle moved towards them. He was unarmed. There is no video of the shooting or the alleged movement of the vehicle. Knoxville Police Department investigated the incident and cleared all deputies.

On July 27, 2019, Johnathan Binkley, age 35, died after being hogtied face down for four minutes. At least seven law enforcement officers were present at the time of death. Binkley was pronounced dead within an hour of being stopped. Binley's mother sued the Sheriff's department. The wrongful death suit was settle for $750,000 in March 2021.

Transportation

Mass transportation
Knoxville Area Transit provides city bus service, while McGhee Tyson Airport features a variety of regional flights to Midwestern and Southern cities.

Major highways

Communities

City
Knoxville (county seat)

Town
Farragut

Census-designated places
Halls Crossroads
John Sevier
Karns
Mascot
Powell

Unincorporated communities

 Beech Grove
 Bonny Kate
Carter
Concord
 Corinth
Corryton
 Grandview
Harbison Crossroads
Hardin Valley
Heiskell
Kimberlin Heights
 King Arthur Court
Midway
Millertown
 New Hopewell
 Shady Grove
 Strawberry Plains (partial)
Solway
Thorn Grove

Education
Knox County School District operates public schools in the county.

Tennessee School for the Deaf is a state operated school in the county.

Further reading
East Tennessee Historical Society, Mary Rothrock (ed.), The French Broad-Holston Country: A History of Knox County, Tennessee. Knoxville, Tenn.: East Tennessee Historical Society, 1946; revised 1972.

See also
National Register of Historic Places listings in Knox County, Tennessee
Knox County Schools

References

External links

Official site

Knox County Charter and Terms Limits Controversy

 
Knoxville metropolitan area
1792 establishments in the Southwest Territory
Populated places established in 1792
Counties of Appalachia
East Tennessee